Ivory tower refers to a world or atmosphere where intellectuals engage in pursuits that are disconnected from the practical concerns of everyday life.

Ivory Tower or The Ivory Tower may also refer to:

 Ivory Tower (Antarctica), a peak in Antarctica
 The Ivory Tower, an unfinished novel by Henry James

Films and entertainment
 The Ivory Tower (1993 film), a 1993 German film directed by Matthias Drawe
 Ivory Tower (1998 film), a 1998 American drama
 Ivory Tower (2010 film), a 2010 Canadian independent film co-written by Gonzales and Céline Sciamma
 Ivory Tower (2014 film), a 2014 American documentary film
 "The Ivory Tower" (Boardwalk Empire)
 Ivory Tower (Harvard Undergraduate Television), a long-running college soap opera
 Ivory Tower (company), a French video game developer

Music 
 "Ivory Tower" (1956 song), a popular song written by Jack Fulton and Lois Steele
 "Ivory Tower", the B-side to the title song "The NeverEnding Story" from the film
 "Ivory Tower" (Van Morrison song), 1986
 "Ivory Tower" (Anna Abreu song), 2007
 The Ivory Tower (album), an album by Takota
 "Ivory Tower", a song from the 2003 album Ghost of a Rose by Blackmore's Night
 "Ivory Tower", a song from the 2017 album A Fever Dream by Everything Everything